The Okoroji House Museum or Okoroji House, (Igbo: Ulo Nta Okoroji, Ogbuti Okoroji), is a historic house and museum located in Ujari, a village in Arochukwu, Abia State, Eastern Nigeria. The house was declared a national monument in 1972 by the National Commission for Museums and Monuments.

History and structure
The house was built during the 17th century by Maazi Okoroji Oti, a local chief and slave merchant, who was active during the trans-atlantic slave trade. The house is made of mud while its roof is made of aluminium zinc. The interior showcases various sacred shrine objects, historical artifacts, slave chains, brass manillas, swords and guns.

References

17th century in Nigeria
Houses completed in the 17th century
Historic house museums in Nigeria
Historic buildings and structures in Nigeria